Seondal: The Man Who Sells the River, also known as Kim Seon-dal, is a South Korean movie based on an ancient novel of satire and humor about Kim Seon-dal who sold off the Taedong River. The filming began on June 5, 2015 and finished September 30, 2015.

Synopsis 
Kim Seondal (Yoo Seung-Ho) is a genius swindler, possessing an alluring appearance and boldness. He works with Bo-Won (Ko Chang-seok), female Buddhist Yoon (Ra Mi-ran) and Gyeon (Kim Min-seok). The swindler team is famous nationwide.
For their plan, they have to deceive the most powerful man Sung Dae-Ryeon (Cho Jae-Hyun)

Cast

Principal 

Yoo Seung-ho as Kim In Hong / Kim Seon-Dal
Cho Jae-hyun as Sung Dae-Ryeon
Ko Chang-seok as Bo-Won
Ra Mi-ran as Buddhist nun Yoon
Kim Min-seok as Gyeon-I

Supporting 

 Jun Suk-ho as Lee Wan
 Seo Yea-ji as Gyu-Young
 Kim Young-pil as Seong Jong-ik
 Choi Gwi-hwa as Cross-dresser fraud nobleman
 Lee Jun-hyeok as Receiver
 Ki Joo-bong as Owner of trading post
 Kwon Tae-won as Second vice-premier
 Kwak In-joon as Manager of the household of high official
 Seo Jeong-joo as Dobatai
 Kim Jong-soo as Noh Dae-gam (Phoenix porcelain fraud Excellency)
 Lee Seon-hee as Village lady
 Ko In-beom as Big trader
 Oh Yoon-hong as Fortune-telling fraud woman

Extended 

Joo Yeong-ho as Palace guard
Kim Seo-kyeong as Palace guard
Lee Kyu-hyung as Chief officer at tobacco guard post
Min Kyeong-jin as Mr. Choi at cotton fabric store
Kim Seung-hoon as eunuch
Lee Sun-hee as Mastermind of the household
Lim Jong-yun as Yi Seong-gye
Yu Soon-woong as Han Bong-soo
Song Jae-ryong as Farmer
Choi Jong-ryul as Merchantman
Jang Jun-nyeong as Prince Cheong
Kim Kyeong-ryong as Jewelry seller
Jo Seong-hun as Jewelry seller
Kim Hye-won as Head of Hanyang Gibang House
Ha Su-ho as Dampago Warehouse guard
Jo Hyun-sik as Dampago Warehouse guard
Kwon Geon-heung as Son of the examiner
Kim Seung-hoon as Royal villa, palace of the Queen, eunuch
Jung Shin-hye as Maid of honor of the Detached Palace 
Baek Cheon-gi as guard of the Detached Palace 
Shin Du-hwan as guard of the Detached Palace 
Kim Min-hyeok as Lee Wan's learner
Kim Tae-min as Lee Wan's learner
Han Sang-woo as Lee Wan's learner
Yu Il-han as Sung Jong-ik's learner
Jo Wi-sang as Sung Jong-ik's learner
An Jae-won  as Sung Jong-ik's learner
Park Kwang-jae as Sung Jong-ik's furniture
Byeon Jin-wan as Dampago's guard
Kwon Yong-chae as Dampago's guard
Kim Jeong-ho as Dampago's guard
Park Dae-gyu as Sung Dae-Ryeon's soldier
Jo Yong-jun as Sung Dae-Ryeon's soldier
Jang Jae-hyuk as Sung Dae-Ryeon's soldier
Choi Jeong-hyun as Sung Dae-Ryeon's soldier
Park Sang-hyun as Sung Dae-Ryeon's soldier
Lee Ju-han as Sung Dae-Ryeon's soldier
Lee Bo-ra as Crown Prince's maid
Uhm Ji-man as Diver
Kwon Yong-sik as Diver
Kim Gil-dong as Cheong's commander
Mun Sung-bok as Lee Sung-gyu's aide
Choi Je-heon as Lee Sung-gyu's soldier
Kim Chang-hui as Armed escort
Lee Yu-hyun as Armed escort
Jeon Sung-hwan as Soldier 
Kim Tae-hyun as Dampago's shopkeeper
Shim Chae-won as Sung Dae-Ryeon's maid
Park Ye-seul as Hanyang gibang's Geisha
Choi Yun-bin as Palanquin holder
Choi Suk-jun as Palanquin holder
Park Jin-sung  Hanyang gibang's servant

Guest appearance 
 Yeon Woo-jin as King Hyojong
Kim Jung-hwa as Head operator at Pyongyang gisaeng salon

References

External links 
 
 Official website of Kim Seon-dal
 Kim Seon-dal on Naver 
 Kim Seon-dal on Daum
 Kim Seon-dal on Movist
 Kim Seon-dal on Korean Movie Data Base

2016 films
2010s historical comedy films
2010s Korean-language films
South Korean historical comedy films
Films set in the Joseon dynasty
CJ Entertainment films
2016 comedy films
2010s South Korean films